The 2021 Capital Football season was the 68th season in Capital Football. The season commenced 10 April 2021. 

The season was suspended from August  from government-imposed lockdowns, due to the impacts from the COVID-19 pandemic in Australia and cancelled in September.

Tigers FC were the NPL1 Premiers (based on a points per match formula rather than aggregate points), and qualified for the 2021 National Premier Leagues final series; they were also the Federation Cup winner, and qualified for the 2021 FFA Cup.

2021 National Premier Leagues Capital Football

NPL 1 is the ACT’s highest senior men’s division. After the season was cancelled, a points per match formula was applied to award Tigers FC as the Premiers, and to relegate Tuggeranong United. The NPL Premier normally qualifies for the national NPL finals series, but the 2021 National Premier Leagues finals series was cancelled.

2021 National Premier Leagues Capital Football 2 

2021 was the second season of NPL 2 as the ACT’s second senior men’s division. After the season was cancelled, a points per match formula was applied to award O'Connor Knights as the Premiers, securing promotion to the 2022 NPL 1 competition.

2021 Capital Football State League 1 

The 2021 ACT Capital Football State League 1 was the seventh edition of the Capital League Division 1 as ACT's third senior men’s division. The season was cancelled in September, with a points per match formula was applied to award Weston Molonglo as the Premiers,

2021 Men's Federation Cup 

This was the 58th edition of the Capital Football Federation Cup, which also served as the preliminary rounds for the FFA Cup in the ACT.

Tigers FC were the Cup winner, entering the FFA Cup at the round of 32. Entry to the competition was staggered, with NPL1 clubs entering the tournament in a later round.

2021 Men's Charity Shield 
The annual ACT Charity Shield kicked off the 2021 Capital Football season. Money raised from the event went towards the Fortem Australia charity. The match was contested between 2020 NPL1 champions Canberra Croatia and 2020 NPL2 Champions Wagga City Wanderers.

2021 Women's National Premier Leagues ACT

2021 was the fourth season of NPL W, the highest tier domestic football competition in the ACT for women’s football. The season was cancelled in September, with a points per match formula was applied to award Canberra Croatia as the Premiers.

2021 Women's Federation Cup

2021 Women's Charity Shield 
The annual ACT Charity Shield was contested to kick off the 2021 Capital Football season. Money raised from the event goes towards a nominated charity, which in 2021 was Fortem Australia. Canberra Croatia and Belconnen United contested the Shield in 2021. The matchup was a replay of the 2020 NPLW grand final.

See also 

Soccer in the Australian Capital Territory
Sport in the Australian Capital Territory

References 

Capital Football